Justin Medeiros is an American professional CrossFit athlete. He is the winner of the 2021 and 2022 CrossFit Games.

Early life

Medeiros was born to Shanna and Anthony Medeiros from Lodi, California, and he has two sisters, Megan and Jessica. He was a student at Lodi High School where he was a wrestler and football player. He took up wrestling after encouragement from his parents as he was not athletic at the time.  He started CrossFit when he was in seventh grade aged 12 in order to keep himself fit between sports seasons, but became more interested in the sport and dropped football for CrossFit after his high school sophomore year. He attended Boise State University where he majored in kinesiology. He focused on CrossFit while at Boise because it had cut its wrestling program. He then moved to Vancouver, Washington to be with his coach Adam Neiffer as courses were made online for a year due to the Covid pandemic, before returning to Boise to complete his education in 2021.

Career
Medeiros was a wrestler and competed in various competitions in California, including the Sac-Joaquin Section Masters Tournament and the California Interscholastic Federation State Wrestling Championships.

Medeiros first competed in CrossFit in the teen division (16–17) in 2016. He finished 19th and failed to reach the Games. He then won the 16-to-18 year old age division at the Wodapalooza CrossFit competition held in Miami in 2017. At the age of 18, Medeiros competed in individual competition at the California Regional, and was placed 15th. This is followed by a 14th-place finish in the West Regional in 2018. In 2019, he just failed to qualify for the CrossFit Games when he finished 4th at the Granite Games.

In 2019, Medeiros earned qualification to the 2020 CrossFit Games after winning the Filthy 150 Sanctional. After competing in an online phase 1 of the Games, he became one of only five athletes who competed in person at the Games, and was named Rookie of the Year. He finished third after Mat Fraser and Samuel Kwant at the Games.

2021–22: CrossFit Games champion
In his second CrossFit Games in 2021, Medeiros performed consistently across all 15 events of the Games, with the lowest placing being 15th in the 1,000 meter row. He did not take over the overall lead until event 7, extending his lead with a second place finish in event 8. He held on to this lead, although he still faced challenges from Patrick Vellner and Brent Fikowski in subsequent events. Medeiros eventually pulled away and sealed his victory with his first ever event win in the final event, beating Patrick Vellner by 82 points to be crowned champion, At the age of 22, Medeiros is the youngest man to have won the Games.

In off-season competitions, Medeiros also won the 2021 Rogue Invitational.

At the 2022 CrossFit Games, Medeiros faced strong challenges from Ricky Garard, who returned after a 4-year ban for drug use, and Roman Khrennikov, who competed in person for the first time despite qualifying for the Games 4 previous times. Garard led the first two days of competition, but faltered in some events and lost the lead to Medeiros. While Medeiros did not win any event this year, his consistent performance at the Games (10 top 5 finishes, only 2 events outside top 10 finishes) allowed him to win the crown for the second time this year.

Medeiros also won the 2022 Rogue Invitational.

CrossFit Games results

References

External links
 
 Justin Medeiros at TrackWrestling

1999 births
Living people
American sportsmen
Sportspeople from California
CrossFit athletes
People from Lodi, California